Adam Zreľák (born 5 May 1994) is a Slovak professional footballer who plays as a forward for Warta Poznań and the Slovakia national team.

Career

MFK Ružomberok
Zreľák made his Corgoň liga debut for Ružomberok's senior side on 3 March 2013 in a match against Senica.

In January 2014, he was on a trial with Russian Premier League side CSKA Moscow.

1. FC Nürnberg
In July 2017, it was announced that Zreľák had signed a contract with Nürnberg in Germany in the 2. Bundesliga.

In late February 2019, Zreľák tore his cruciate ligament during training and missed the remainder of the 2018–19 Bundesliga season.

In February 2021, Zreľák requested his release from Nürnberg following low play-time and upcoming contract expiry.

Warta Poznań
On 11 February 2021, he signed a half-season contract with an option for a two-year extension with Polish Ekstraklasa club Warta Poznań.

International career
Zreľák has represented various Slovak youth teams and he was a member of the Slovakia U21 team that played at the 2017 European Under-21 Championships in Poland. At these Euros, Slovakia beat the hosts Poland 2–1 and Sweden 3–0. Slovakia lost 2–1 to England and narrowly missed out on qualifying for the semi-finals. In total, he scored 14 goals in 25 appearances.

Zreľák made his senior international debut for Slovakia in 2013 as a 19-year-old. Moreover, he scored his first international goal for Slovakia in a friendly 3–1 win over Georgia on 27 May 2016. In only his third international appearance for Slovakia, Zreľák scored his second international goal for his country, this time against Ukraine in a Nations League game.

Career statistics

International goals
Scores and results list Slovakia's goal tally first.

References

External links
 
 MFK Ružomberok profile
 Corgoň Liga profile

1994 births
Living people
People from Stará Ľubovňa
Sportspeople from the Prešov Region
Slovak footballers
Slovak expatriate footballers
Slovakia international footballers
Slovakia youth international footballers
Slovakia under-21 international footballers
Association football forwards
MFK Ružomberok players
ŠK Slovan Bratislava players
FK Jablonec players
1. FC Nürnberg players
Warta Poznań players
Slovak Super Liga players
Czech First League players
2. Bundesliga players
Bundesliga players
Regionalliga players
Ekstraklasa players
Expatriate footballers in the Czech Republic
Expatriate footballers in Germany
Expatriate footballers in Poland
Slovak expatriate sportspeople in the Czech Republic
Slovak expatriate sportspeople in Germany
Slovak expatriate sportspeople in Poland